Puppet on a Chain is a novel by Scottish author Alistair MacLean. Originally published in 1969 with a cover by Norman Weaver, it is set in the late 1960s narcotics underworld of Amsterdam and other locations in the Netherlands.

Plot introduction
Paul Sherman is a veteran Interpol Narcotics Bureau agent, used to independent action and blunt force tactics. He is assisted by two attractive female agents, one an experienced operative, the other a rookie. Sherman is in the Netherlands after receiving word about a vicious heroin smuggling ring from a friend. However, the narco-criminals will kill ruthlessly to protect its operation and even before Sherman can leave Schiphol Airport he has already witnessed the gunning down of his key contact, been knocked half-unconscious by an assassin, and tangled with local authorities. "Puppet on a Chain" has the standard twisting plot, local atmospherics, and sardonic dialogue that were Maclean's trademarks as a story-teller. Maclean allows his protagonist to have a bantering sarcastic relationship with his assistants that provides a streak of humor as the plot unfolds. Unfortunately, Sherman's relationship with his assistants is used against him. As his investigation is undermined by betrayal, leaving him constantly a half-step behind his adversaries, Sherman must resort to increasingly violent action to turn the tables. The story culminates in a violent struggle above the streets of Amsterdam to save the life of his surviving female operative, not knowing whether anyone they meet can really be trusted.

Reception
The New York Times called the book "one of the best in the Greene-Ambler-MacInnes tradition... the writing is as crisp as a sunny winter morning".

The book became a best seller.

Background
MacLean got the idea for the book from visiting Amsterdam with then business partner Geoffrey Reve who later directed the film version.

Film adaptation

Puppet on a Chain later appeared in film as a 1970 movie directed by Geoffrey Reeve.

References

External links
 Book review at AlistairMacLean.com
 Internet Movie Database

1969 British novels
Fiction set in the 1960s
British novels adapted into films
Novels about drugs
Novels by Alistair MacLean
Novels set in the Netherlands
William Collins, Sons books